Heterodera elachista, the Japanese cyst nematode or rice cyst nematode, is a plant pathogenic nematode, which is cited as an invasive species.

References 

elachista
Plant pathogenic nematodes
Nematodes described in 1974